Mahur-e Chah Gandali (also Romanized as Māhūr-e Chāh Gandalī) is a village in Shahid Modarres Rural District, in the Central District of Shushtar County, Khuzestan Province, Iran. At the 2006 census, its population was 130, in 22 families.

References 

Populated places in Shushtar County